Kraken 40 is a trimaran designed by Lock Crowther in Australia and first built in 1970.

See also
List of multihulls
Lock Crowther
Kraken 18
Kraken 25
Kraken 33

References

Trimarans